Montana Bill is a 1921 American silent Western film directed by Phil Goldstone from a screenplay by A. M. Levey. The film stars William Fairbanks, Maryon Aye, and Robert Kortman.

Cast
 William Fairbanks as Montana Bill
 Maryon Aye as Ruth
 Robert Kortman
 Jack Waltemeyer
 Ernest Van Pelt
 Hazel Hart

References

1921 films
1921 Western (genre) films
American black-and-white films
Silent American Western (genre) films
1920s American films